The Secret War of Harry Frigg is a 1968 American comedy war film set in World War II. It was directed by Jack Smight and stars Paul Newman.

Plot
Several brigadier generals (American, British, and French) are unexpectedly taken prisoner by the Italian army while arguing military tactics in a sauna; this is a public relations disaster for the Allies. The brigadiers are held in an Italian villa, run by the benevolent Colonel Ferrucci, as a luxurious version of a prison camp. Being all of the same rank, none is in command and they are forced to plan escapes by committee, with predictably ineffective results.

Meanwhile, Allied headquarters devises a plot to free them by sending in Harry Frigg (Paul Newman). Frigg is a private in the U.S. Army, a malcontent who has a history of escaping from military stockades. As incentive, he is promised a promotion to master sergeant after the generals have been freed. Accepting the mission, Frigg is "promoted" to major general so that he will outrank all the prisoners, assume command and lead the resultant breakout. Parachuted behind enemy lines, Frigg allows himself to be captured, and, as planned, is imprisoned in the same jail as the brigadiers. While they are initially skeptical of Frigg's rank, he has been given a few personal secrets about them that only a senior officer might be expected to know.

Frigg discovers a secret passage, which has potential for use during the getaway. It starts in his bedroom and takes him to the gatehouse outside the villa's fence where the owner of the property, Countess Francesca De Montefiore (Sylva Koscina) is living. The escape plan is put on hold when the two become romantically involved.

Eventually, it cannot be avoided any longer and the scheme is reactivated.  On the eve of the group's intended breakout, Colonel Ferrucci announces that because of the low escape rate in the complex, he is to be promoted to general at midnight the following night. The group decides to put their plans off by a day to ensure the Colonel gets promoted, despite knowing that his rank will be stripped once they do escape. During the celebration, a German major arrives, and at midnight he announces that Italy has surrendered to the Allies, and everyone present are now his prisoners.

The Germans transfer the generals to a high-security prison camp for officers. Escape seems hopeless. Frigg confesses to being only a private, and is separated from the rest to be delivered to a basic holding camp for NCOs. Slipping away from his guard, he then breaks back into the officers' camp, subsequently freeing them all and capturing the Major in the process.

The film concludes with Frigg ending the war as a master sergeant; he is offered the opportunity to be in charge of a radio station, and a promotion to second lieutenant. While discussing the role, Frigg and his entourage pass the countess' castle. He dashes in to reunite with her and realizes that the villa is the perfect base for the radio station.

Cast
Paul Newman as Private/Major General/Sergeant/2nd Lt. Harry Frigg
Sylva Koscina as Countess Francesca De Montefiore
Andrew Duggan as Brigadier General Newton Armstrong
Tom Bosley as Brigadier General Roscoe Pennypacker
John Williams as Brigadier Francis Mayhew
Charles Gray as Brigadier Adrian Cox-Roberts
Vito Scotti as Colonel/Brigadier General Enrico Ferrucci
Jacques Roux as Brigade General Andre Rochambeau
Werner Peters as Major von Steignitz
James Gregory as Brigadier General Homer Prentiss
Fabrizio Mioni as Lieutenant Rossano
Johnny Haymer as Sergeant Pozzallo
Norman Fell as Captain Stanley
Buck Henry as Stockade Commandant

Production
The film was originally titled Back at the Front.

See also
List of American films of 1968

References

External links
 
 
 

1968 films
1968 comedy films
1960s war comedy films
American war comedy films
Films directed by Jack Smight
Films scored by Carlo Rustichelli
Films set in Italy
Italian Campaign of World War II films
Military humor in film
Universal Pictures films
World War II prisoner of war films
1960s English-language films
1960s American films